FC Holguín is a Cuban football club based in Banes, Holguín Province. Its home stadium is the 1,000-capacity Estadio Luis Augusto Turcios Lima. In 2014, it was relegated from the Cuban first division.

Current squad

Achievements
Campeonato Nacional de Fútbol de Cuba: 1
 2006

References

Holguin
Holguín